Oiyl is a district of Aktobe Region in Kazakhstan. The administrative center of the selo of Oiyl. Population:

References

Districts of Kazakhstan
Aktobe Region